This is a partial list of the British Air Ministry (AM) specifications for aircraft. A specification stemmed from an Operational Requirement, abbreviated "OR", describing what the aircraft would be used for. This in turn led to the specification itself, e.g. a two-engined fighter with four machine guns. So for example, OR.40 for a heavy bomber led to Specification B.12/36. Aircraft manufacturers would be invited to present design proposals to the ministry, following which prototypes of one or more of the proposals might be ordered for evaluation. On very rare occasions, a manufacturer would design and build an aircraft using their own money as a "private venture" (PV). This would then be offered to the ministry for evaluation. The ministry may well release a specification based on the private venture aircraft if the plane aroused interest from the RAF or the ministry due to its performance or some other combination of features.

The system of producing aircraft to a specification ran from 1920 to 1949 during which the Air Ministry was replaced by first the Ministry of Aircraft Production (MAP) in 1940 and then the Ministry of Supply (MoS) in 1946. The system was applied to commercial aircraft as well, two being the de Havilland Comet and Vickers Viscount. During the period, over 800 specifications were issued.

Specification designations
Each specification name usually followed a pattern. A leading letter was usually present to identify the aircraft purpose. The codes used included B for "heavy bomber", e.g., B.12/36, P for "medium bomber", e.g., P.13/36, F for "fighter", e.g., F.10/35, and A for "army co-operation", e.g., A.39/34. The second part was a number identifying it in sequence and then after the slash, the year it was formulated, so in the example given above, B.12/36 signifies a specification for a heavy bomber, the twelfth specification of all types issued in 1936. Specifications were not always issued in sequence.

Admiralty specifications were identified by the letter N (Naval), e.g., N.21/45, and experimental specifications identified by the letter E (Experimental), e.g., E.28/39, with training aircraft signified by the letter T (Training), e.g., T.23/31, and unpowered aircraft, signified by the letter X, e.g., X.26/40. The letter G (General) signified a general-purpose aircraft, e.g., G.9/45, with an M (Multi-role) being applied to aircraft intended for more than one specific purpose, e.g., M.15/35.

The letter C (Cargo) was applied to military transport aircraft, e.g., C.1/42, with the letter O (Observation) used for a naval reconnaissance aircraft, e.g., O.8/38 – the letter S (Spotter) used for the more specialised role of naval spotting, i.e., observing and reporting back the fall of naval gunfire, e.g., S.38/34 – and R (Reconnaissance) for a reconnaissance type – often a flying boat, e.g., R.3/33. Special purpose aircraft would be signified by a letter Q, this being used to specify aircraft such as target-tugs, radio-controlled target drones, etc., e.g., Q.32/55.

Sometimes the purpose for which an aircraft is used in service would change from that for which the specification to which it was designed was issued, and so there are some discrepancies and inconsistencies in designation, the Royal Navy in particular liking to specify multiple roles for its aircraft in an attempt to make the best use of the necessarily limited hangar space onboard its aircraft carriers. In this case this resulted in several types designed to specifications originally intended to signify the naval Spotting role also being used for other purposes, e.g., S.15/33, resulting in the Blackburn Shark and Fairey Swordfish, the latter aircraft being primarily utilised as a torpedo bomber. Similarly S.24/37, which produced the Fairey Barracuda, again primarily designed for spotting, the dive bomber/torpedo bomber requirements being regarded as secondary when the specification was issued, but for which roles it was almost exclusively subsequently used, the original spotting requirement having been made obsolete with the introduction of radar.

In addition, some (mostly early) specifications appear to have no letter prefix at all, e.g., 1/21, the Vickers Virginia III.

List of specifications (incomplete)
The names of the aircraft shown in the table are not necessarily those they carried when provided for evaluation as at this point an aircraft would usually be referred-to as the Manufacturer X.XX/XX, e.g., the Avro B.35/46 – this is in addition to the manufacturer's own separate internal designation for the aircraft, e.g., Avro 698. With several manufacturers submitting designs to the same specification this could result in a number of different aircraft with the same X.XX/XX designation, e.g., Handley Page B.35/46, etc. Upon acceptance of the design(s) the final service names would usually be chosen by the Air Ministry when they placed a production order, in the above B.35/46 cases, where two aircraft were accepted to this specification, Vulcan and Victor respectively.

Upon entering service, in the absence of any already-planned variants a new type would initially have no mark number after the aircraft name, being simply referred to as the Manufacturer Service-name, e.g., the Avro Anson, however upon acceptance of a new variant the previous (initial) version automatically became the 'Mark I', so in the example given, the previous (first) version of the Anson retrospectively became the Avro Anson Mk I upon acceptance of an Avro Anson Mk II. Sometimes planned variants would be later cancelled leading to 'missing' mark numbers, or the extent of the changes may have justified given the new variant a completely new name, e.g., the Hawker Typhoon II subsequently becoming the Hawker Tempest, or the Avro Lancaster B.IV & B.V entering service as the Avro Lincoln. In a few cases the same aircraft ordered with differing engines would be allocated separate names for each variant, e.g., Hawker Typhoon and Hawker Tornado, or the Handley Page Hampden and Handley Page Hereford. Typographical designation of mark numbers (Mk.) varied over time and inconsistencies are common, e.g., Mark II, Mk. II, II, etc. Initially Roman numerals were used, changing to Arabic numerals post-World War II, e.g., Supermarine Spitfire Mk I to Supermarine Spitfire Mk 24.

Note 1: where possible mark numbers are given here in this list in the form that was used at the time of acceptance. Variations may be encountered due to changes in format/typographical convention.

Note 2: due to mergers and amalgamations within the UK aircraft industry sometimes the name of the manufacturer changed over time, e.g., English Electric later became part of the British Aircraft Corporation (BAC), so the English Electric Lightning then became the BAC Lightning; the British Aircraft Corporation itself and Hawker Siddeley (HS) then later merged and became British Aerospace, subsequently becoming BAe (now BAE Systems). Thus the previously mentioned Avro Vulcan was subsequently referred-to as the Hawker Siddeley Vulcan; similarly, the Blackburn Buccaneer later became the Hawker Siddeley Buccaneer. Where possible, for clarity the aircraft in this list are listed under the ORIGINATING company's name or the name of the manufacturer under which it first entered production.

Specifications within the tables are listed in numerical order by year of issue; where a given number appears more than once, with one or more letter prefixes, the entries are presented in alphabetical order.

Air Board specifications (1917–1918)
In 1917, the Air Board began to issue specifications for new aircraft on behalf of the Royal Flying Corps and Royal Navy Air Service, with separate series for the RFC and Navy.

RAF specifications (1918–1920)
Data from: The British Aircraft Specifications File

1920–1929
Data from: The British Aircraft Specifications File

1930–1939
{| class="wikitable"
|-
! width=100 |Spec
! width=100 |OR
! width=400 |Type
! Designs
|-
|M.1/30
|
|Torpedo bomber – Spec. supersedes M5/28 (q.v.)
|Blackburn M.1/30, Handley Page H.P.46, Vickers Type 207
|-
|2/30
|
|Dual control conversion set issued to Blackburn but then cancelled
|
|-
|3/30
|
|Basic trainer – Avro 504N replacement
|Avro Type 621 Trainer
|-
|5/30
|
|Mail carrier
|Vickers Type 166 Vellore II
|-
|6/30
|
|ab initio trainer – Lynx-Avro (Avro 504N) production order
|Avro 504N
|-
|F.7/30
|OR.1
|Fighter capable of at least 250 mph and armed with four machine guns
|Blackburn F.3, Bristol Type 123, Bristol Type 133, Gloster Gladiator, Gloster SS.19, Hawker P.V.3, Supermarine Type 224, Westland F.7/30
|-
|8/30
|
|ab initio trainer – Moth with Gypsy II order
|de Havilland Moth
|-
|S.9/30
|
|Two-seat carrier-borne torpedo bomber/three-seat spotter-reconnaissance aircraft
|Fairey T.S.R.I, Gloster FS.36; see also S.15/33
|-
|16/30
|
|Naval fighter – written for Nimrod
|Hawker Nimrod
|-
|18/30
|
|Fairey IIIF replacement
|Fairey Gordon I
|-
|19/30
|
|Naval fighter/reconnaissance with folding wings and interchangeable wheel/float U/C
|Hawker Osprey
|-
|G.4/31
|OR.2
|General-purpose/torpedo bomber – Wapiti & Gordon replacement – Wellesley one of two designs submitted by Vickers and itself a PV – see also G.22/35
|Blackburn B-7, Bristol Type 120, Fairey G.4/31, Handley Page H.P.47, Hawker P.V.4, Parnall G.4/31, Vickers G.4/31, Vickers Wellesley, Westland PV-7
|-
|5/31
|
|Long-range bomber – Virginia production order
|Vickers Virginia
|-
|13/31
|
|ab initio trainer with complete freedom for parachute escape by both occupants – D.H.60T accepted with modifications, becoming D.H.82 – see also T.23/31 (some sources give 13/31 as an order for the Ripon IIC)
|Avro Type 631 Cadet, de Havilland D.H. 60T Tiger Moth
|-
|18/31
|
|Basic trainer – Avro Type 621 Trainer with Lynx engine
|Avro Tutor
|-
|R.19/31
|
|Three-engined long-range reconnaissance flying boat – Rangoon three-aircraft production order
|Short Rangoon
|-
|R.20/31
|
|Twin-engined flying boat – all-metal Kestrel-engined Southampton II (Southampton IV/Scapa)
|Supermarine Scapa
|-
|T.23/31
|
|Tiger Moth I production order
|de Havilland Tiger Moth I
|-
|R.24/31
|OR.3
|"General Purpose Open Sea Patrol Flying Boat"
|Saunders Roe London, Short R.24/31 Knuckleduster, Supermarine Stranraer
|-
|C.26/31
|OR.4
|Bomber-transport – Valentia replacement
|Armstrong Whitworth A.W.23, Bristol Bombay, Handley Page H.P.51. Vickers Type 230 – (not built)
|-
|B.9/32
|OR.5
|Twin-engine medium day bomber with appreciably higher performance than predecessors – later revised to specify Goshawk power and subsequently re-revised with Goshawk requirement dropped
|Vickers Wellington(renamed from 'Crecy'), Handley Page Hampden, Bristol Type 131
|-
|S.11/32
|OR.6
|Naval catapult observation/spotting seaplane for carriage on cruisers
|Fairey Seafox
|-
|T.12/32
|
|Trainer
|Bristol Type 124
|-
|19/32
|
|Conversion of Westland Wapiti into Westland Wallace standard
|Westland Wallace
|-
|20/32
|
|Three-engined long-range reconnaissance flying boat – improved Iris with Buzzard engines
|Blackburn Perth
|-
|25/32
|
|Basic trainer – revised-Tutor production order
|Avro Tutor I
|-
|B.23/32
|
|Twin-engine medium bomber – written for Heyford I & IA production order
|Handley Page Heyford Mk. I/IA
|-
|P.27/32
|OR.7
|Light day bomber – Hart/Hind replacement – see P.23/35
|Armstrong Whitworth A.W.29, Fairey Battle, Gloster P.27/32, Bristol Type 136
|-
|R.1/33
|
|Patrol/reconnaissance flying boat
|Westland-Hill Pterodactyl Mk.VII
|-
|R.2/33
|OR.8
|Long-range patrol/reconnaissance flying boat
|Short Sunderland, Saro A.33
|-
|R.3/33
|
|Long-range patrol/reconnaissance flying boat – trials order for Singapore III
|Short Singapore III
|-
|F.5/33
|OR.9
|Twin-engine two-seat turret fighter – later cancelled
|Armstrong Whitworth A.W.34, Boulton Paul P.76, Bristol Type 140, Gloster F.5/33, Parnall F.5/33, Westland-Hill Pterodactyl Mk.V
|-
|T.6/33
|
|Tiger Moth floatplane two aircraft evaluation order
|de Havilland Tiger Moth
|-
|13/33
|
|4-engined mail seaplane and 4-engine flying boat carrier – Short-Mayo Composite
|Short S.20 Mercury, Short S.21 Maia
|-
|14/33
|
|Fairey Gordon II production order
|Fairey Gordon II
|-
|S.15/33
|OR.10
|Naval carrier-borne torpedo bomber/spotter/reconnaissance (TSR) – Fairey 9/30 (q.v.) design modified and re-submitted as T.S.R.II – Spec. replaces S.9/30 & M.1/30 (q.v.)
|Blackburn Shark, Fairey Swordfish, Gloster TSR.38
|-
|18/33
|
|Radio-controlled Fleet gunnery target aircraft
|de Havilland Queen Bee
|-
|21/33
|
|Three-seat general purpose/Army co-operation aircraft – Fairey IIIF/Wapiti replacement – improved Vildebeest
|Vickers Vildebeest
|-
|F.22/33
|OR.11
|Fighter
|Bristol Type 141
|-
|G.23/33
|
|General purpose aeroplane – Hart for Middle East
|Hawker Hardy
|-
|24/33
|
|Gloster Gauntlet production order
|Gloster Gauntlet
|-
|25/33
|
|Twin-engined troop and cargo transport – improved Victoria
|Vickers Valentia
|-
|T.26/33
|
|Tiger Moth II production order
|de Havilland Tiger Moth II
|-
|B.29/33
|
|Twin engine medium day bomber with power-operated nose turret
|Boulton Paul Sidestrand V (Overstrand)
|-
|1/34
|
|Two-seat Army Co-operation Fighter Bomber for the Royal Australian Air Force
|Hawker Demon
|-
|2/34
|
|High-altitude research aircraft capable of reaching 50,000 ft
|Bristol Type 138A
|-
|B.3/34
|OR.12
|Heavy bomber landplane, twin-engine night bomber & bomber/transport – Virginia, Heyford & Hendon replacement – transport requirement later removed after protests from manufacturers
|Armstrong Whitworth Whitley, Bristol Type 144
|-
|P.4/34
|OR.13
|Light day bomber for tactical support
|Fairey P.4/34, Hawker Henley
|-
|F.5/34
|OR.14
|Single-seat fighter (although contracts were placed for prototypes with three companies none were ordered into production)
|Bristol Type 146, Martin-Baker M.B.2, Vickers Type 279 Venom, Gloster F.5/34
|-
|6/34
|
|Single-engine biplane amphibian for Australia.
|Supermarine Seagull V
|-
|G.7/34
|
|Two-seat general purpose light bomber, Interim Hart day bomber replacement
|Hawker Hind
|-
|8/34
|
|Two-seat interceptor fighter (production of Demon I for the RAF)
|Hawker Demon
|-
|9/34
|
|Two-seat day bomber and army co-operation aircraft (production of Hawker Audax)
|Hawker Audax
|-
|10/34
|
|Hawker Hart communications aircraft (two aircraft delivered to No. 24 Squadron RAF)
|Hawker Hart
|-
|11/34
|
|Torpedo spotter reconnaissance aircraft development (One Fairey Seal fitted with an Armstrong Siddeley Panther VI engine)
|Fairey Seal
|-
|12/34
|
|Torpedo spotter reconnaissance aircraft development (production of 16 Sharks for use by No. 820 Squadron RAF)
|Blackburn Shark
|-
|13/34
|
|Bulldog trainer production (production of Bulldog TM Type 124)
|Bristol Bulldog
|-
|R.14/34
|
|Singapore III production order
|Short Singapore III
|-
|15/34
|
|Three-seat torpedo bomber (production of Mk III)
|Vickers Vildebeest
|-
|16/34
|
|Three-seat general purpose aircraft – Vincent I production order including conversion of outstanding Vildebeests to Vincents
|Vickers Vincent I
|-
|17/34
|
|Torpedo bomber (additional Baffin T.8A aircraft for conversion training, three built)
|Blackburn Baffin
|-
|18/34
|
|Single-engine day bomber (Hawker Hart IB production)
|Hawker Hart
|-
|19/34
|
|Two-seat Army co-operation aircraft (production of Audax Is for use in India, 50 aircraft built
|Hawker Audax
|-
|B.20/34
|
|Twin-engine night bomber – Hendon production order to this spec – see also B.19/27
|Fairey Hendon
|-
|21/34
|
|Two-seat fleet spotter reconnaissance aircraft (Osprey III production)
|Hawker Osprey
|-
|22/34
|
|Close-support aircraft – Audax for SAAF
|Hawker Hartebees
|-
|B.23/34
|
|Twin engine medium day bomber – Overstrand production order
|Boulton Paul Overstrand
|-
|24/34
|
|Basic trainer – production order for second batch of definitive Tutor design – see 3/30, 18/31 & 25/32
|Avro Tutor I
|-
|25/34
|
|Amphibian trainer (production of three Clouds)
|Saro Cloud
|-
|26/34
|
|Float seaplane trainer (production of 16 Tutors for the Seaplane Training School)
|Avro Type 646 Sea Tutor
|-
|O.27/34
|OR.15
|Naval dive bomber
|Blackburn Skua
|-
|B.28/34
|
|Twin-engine medium bomber – written for Heyford II production order
|Handley Page Heyford Mk. II
|-
|29/34
|
|Hawker Fury for the South African Air Force
|Hawker Fury
|-
|30/34
|
|Twin-engined troop and cargo transport – Valentia I production order
|Vickers Valentia I
|-
|31/34
|
|Armoured day bomber (development of armoured crew protection for the Hart)
|Hawker Hart
|-
|32/34
|
|Navigation trainer – Prefect production order
|Avro 626/Prefect
|-
|F.36/34
|OR.16
|High Speed Monoplane Single Seater Fighter (based on the Hawker submission to F.5/34)
|Hawker Hurricane
|-
|F.37/34
|OR.17
|High Speed Monoplane Single Seater Fighter (based on the private venture Supermarine Type 300 submission)
|Supermarine Spitfire
|-
|S.38/34
|
|Written for Swordfish production order
|Fairey Swordfish I
|-
|A.39/34
|OR.18
|Two-seat Army co-operation aeroplane
|Bristol Type 148, Westland Lysander
|-
|B.1/35
|OR.19
|Twin-engine heavy bomber
|Airspeed A.S.29, Boulton Paul P.79, Armstrong Whitworth A.W.39, Handley Page H.P.55, Vickers Warwick
|-
|2/35
|
|Naval catapult-launched observation/spotting flying boat for carriage on cruisers
|Supermarine Walrus
|-
|F.9/35
|OR.20
|Two-seat four-gun turret fighter – Demon replacement
|Hawker Hotspur, Boulton Paul Defiant, Bristol Type 147
|-
|F.10/35
|
|Drawn up for the Spitfire prototype
|Supermarine Spitfire
|- valign="top"
|13/35
|
|Naval torpedo-spotter-reconnaissance aircraft – written for Shark production order
|Blackburn Shark
|-
|14/35
|
|Army Co-operation aircraft – Audax replacement
|Hawker Hector
|-
|F.14/35
|
|Written for Gladiator I initial production order
|Gloster Gladiator I
|-
|M.15/35
|
|Land-based general reconnaissance/torpedo-bomber
|Blackburn Botha, Bristol Beaufort
|-
|16/35
|
|Autogyro – written for Cierva C.30/Avro 671 Rota evaluation order
|Avro Rota
|-
|18/35
|
|Twin-engined coastal reconnaissance landplane – written for Anson
|Avro Anson
|-
|20/35
|
|Radio-controlled Fleet gunnery target aircraft – Queen Bee production order
|de Havilland Queen Bee
|-
|B.21/35
|
|Twin-engine medium bomber – written for Whitley II production order
|Armstrong Whitworth Whitley II
|-
|G.22/35
|
|General-purpose day and night bomber and coastal-defence torpedo-carrier – Wellesley production order – see also G.4/31
|Vickers Wellesley
|-
|P.23/35
|
|Written for Battle I production order
|Fairey Battle I
|-
|G.24/35
|
|General Reconnaissance – Anson replacement
|Bristol Type 149, Bristol Beaufort
|-
|26/35
|
|Naval fighter/reconnaissance – Osprey IV production order
|Hawker Osprey IV
|-
|B.27/35
|
|Twin-engine medium bomber – written for Heyford III production order
|Handley Page Heyford Mk. III
|-
|B.28/35
|
|Drawn up for Bristol 142M
|Bristol Blenheim
|-
|B.29/35
|
|Written for Harrow initial production order
|Handley Page Harrow
|-
|O.30/35
|
|Naval turret-fighter – fighter development of Skua accepted
|Blackburn Roc, Boulton Paul P.85
|-
|Q.32/35
|
|Radio-controlled Fleet Gunnery target aircraft – Queen Bee replacement
|Airspeed Queen Wasp
|-
|F.34/35
|
|Twin-engined turret-armed fighter
| Gloster F.34/35
|-
|F.35/35
|
|Very high speed fighter
|Airspeed A.S.31, General Aircraft GAL.28, Bristol Type 151, Hawker Hurricane variant (none built)
|-
|36/35
|
|Trans-Atlantic mail plane
|de Havilland Albatross
|-
|F.37/35
|OR.31
|Fighter with cannon
|Westland Whirlwind, Hawker Hurricane with Oerlikon cannon, Supermarine Type 313, Bristol Type 153
|-
|39/35
|
|Twin-engine communications aircraft – Envoy with dorsal turret order for SAAF
|Airspeed Envoy
|-
|R.1/36
|OR.32
|Small reconnaissance flying boat
|Saro Lerwick, Blackburn B-20
|-
|2/36
|
|Development of the Cierva C.30 (cancelled)
|
|- valign="top"
|3/36
|
|Development of the Avro 652A (cancelled)
|
|-
|4/36
|
|Catapult bomber (cancelled)
|Short S.27
|-
|5/36
|OR.33
|Improved Walrus for the Fleet Air Arm
|Supermarine Walrus
|-
|T.6/36
|OR.34
|Advanced monoplane trainer mounting manually operated dorsal turret – Don accepted but proved unsuitable
|de Havilland Don, Miles Kestrel
|-
|M.7/36
|
|Torpedo Spotter Reconnaissance aircraft (cancelled)
|Fairey Albacore
|-
|O.8/36
|OR.36
|Reconnaissance dive bomber for the Fleet Air Arm (cancelled)
|
|-
|
|S.9/36
|Three-seat spotter fighter for the Fleet Air Arm (cancelled)
|Fairey S.9/36
|-
|10/36
|OR.38
|Written for Beaufort production order
|Bristol Beaufort I
|-
|11/36
|OR.39
|Interim General Reconnaissance – aircraft later renamed 'Blenheim IV' and 'Bolingbroke' name transferred to Canadian-built Blenheim
|Bristol Bolingbroke I
|-
|B.12/36
|OR.40
|Four-engine heavy bomber 250 mph cruise, 1500 mile range, 4000 lb bomb load
|Armstrong Whitworth B.12/36, Short Stirling, Supermarine Type 316
|-
|P.13/36
|OR.41
|Twin-engined medium bomber for "world-wide use" introduction delayed due to production difficulties necessitating further order of Whitleys & Wellingtons
|Avro Manchester (2 prototypes ordered), Handley Page H.P.56 (two prototype ordered), Hawker P.13/36 (project only), Vickers Warwick with Rolls-Royce Vulture engines.|-
|14/36
|
|Production specification for the Fairey Battle I
|Fairey Battle (500 ordered later reduced to 311)
|-
|F.15/36
|
|Written for Hurricane redesigned for Merlin II
|Hawker Hurricane I
|-
|17/36
|
|Written for Hotspur initial production order – later cancelled
|Hawker Hotspur; cancelled
|-
|19/36
|
|Naval torpedo-spotter-reconnaissance aircraft – written for Shark additional production order
|Blackburn Shark
|-
|B.20/36
|
|Twin-engine medium bomber – written for Whitley III production order
|Armstrong Whitworth Whitley III
|-
|T.23/36
|
|Multi-role crew trainer
|Airspeed Oxford
|- valign="top"
|25/36
|
|Written for Skua initial production order
|Blackburn Skua
|-
|26/36
|
|Written for Roc initial production order
|Blackburn Roc
|-
|29/36
|
|Written for Wellington (revised Crecy from B.9/32) initial production order
|Vickers Wellington I
|-
|B.30/36
|
|Written for Hampden initial production order
|Handley Page Hampden I
|-
|33/36
|
|Written for Blenheim I production order (Rootes)
|Bristol Blenheim I
|-
|36/36
|
|Written for Lysander initial production order
|Westland Lysander I
|-
|37/36
|
|Written for Walrus additional production order
|Supermarine Walrus I
|-
|39/36
|
|Written for Botha additional production order (Boulton Paul) – cancelled
|Blackburn Botha
|-
|T.40/36
|OR.44
|Development and production of a trainer version of the Miles Hawk
|Miles Magister
|-
|S.41/36
|
|Three-seat torpedo/spotter-reconnaissance aircraft – Swordfish replacement
|Fairey Albacore
|-
|42/36
|
|Target tug – order for Henley target tug conversions by Gloster's
|Hawker Henley III
|-
|43/36
|
|Autogyro
|Cierva C.40 Rota II
|-
|B.44/36
|
|Written for Dagger-Hampden (Hereford) production order
|Handley Page Hereford I
|-
|45/36
|
|Written for Botha additional production order (Blackburn) – cancelled
|Blackburn Botha
|-
|47/36
|
|Written for Bombay II production order
|Bristol Bombay II
|-
|T.1/37
|
|Basic trainer
|Heston T.1/37 Trainer, Miles M.15, Parnall Heck III, Airspeed A.S.36 (not built)
|-
|2/37
|
|Written for Blenheim I production order (Avro)
|Bristol Blenheim I
|-
|6/37
|
|Twin-engine VIP transport aircraft – order for The King's Flight
|Airspeed Envoy
|-
|Q.8/37
|
|Radio-controlled Fleet Gunnery target aircraft – Queen Bee replacement – role subsequently carried-on by Queen Wasp – see Q.32/35
|Airspeed A.S.37 (not built)
|-
|F.9/37
|OR.49
|Twin-engine day/night fighter
|Gloster G.39
|-
|F.11/37
|
|Twin-engine two-seat day & night fighter/ground support
|Boulton Paul P.92
|-
|F.18/37
|
|Heavily armed interceptor armed with 12 x 0.303 mgs and capable of at least 400 mph
|Bristol F.18/37, Gloster F.18/37, Hawker Tornado, Hawker Typhoon, Supermarine Type 324, Supermarine Type 325
|-
|19/37
|
|Written for Manchester I production order
|Avro Manchester I
|-
|20/37
|
|Written for Roc floatplane production order
|Blackburn Roc
|-
|S.23/37
|OR.52
|Four-engine carrier-based Fleet shadower/follower – low-speed, high-endurance, ship-tracking aircraft – requirement later rendered obsolete due to introduction of radar
|Airspeed AS.39, General Aircraft GAL.38
|-
|S.24/37
|OR.53
|Naval torpedo/dive-bomber, reconnaissance – Supermarine entry featured variable-incidence wing
|Supermarine S.24/37, Fairey Barracuda
|-
|32/37
|
|Written for Halifax initial production order
|Handley Page Halifax I Srs 1 – I Srs 3
|-
|B.32/37
|OR.44
|Production contract for a four-engine version of the P.13/36 H.P.56 design
|Handley Page H.P.57 Halifax
|-
|37/37
|
|Magister I production order
|Miles Magister I
|-
|38/37
|
|Three-seat communications aircraft & instrument/wireless trainer
|Miles Mentor
|-
|T.39/37
|
|Three-seat communications aircraft & instrument/wireless trainer
|Airspeed AS.42 Oxford for the Royal New Zealand Air Force
|-
|42/37
|
|Specification for wooden mockup of Miles X2 large transport aeroplane – not built – lead to Miles M.30X Minor scale testbed
|Miles M.30X Minor
|-
|43/37
|
|Engine testbed
|Folland Fo.108; designs also tendered by General Aircraft & Percival
|-
|S.7/38
|
|Naval catapult-launched observation/spotting flying boat – Walrus replacement
|Supermarine Sea Otter
|-
|O.8/38
|
|Naval carrier-borne fighter/observation – winner developed from Fairey's earlier P.4/34 entry
|Fairey Fulmar
|-
|B.9/38
|
|Twin-engine medium bomber of simple construction using materials other than light alloy wherever possible
|see B.17/38 and B.18/38
|-
|14/38
|
|Long-range pressurised high-altitude monoplane transport/airliner (Shorts) – 3 prototypes ordered, construction started – cancelled
|Short S.32
|-
|15/38
|
|Short/Medium-range monoplane transport/airliner (Fairey) – Fairey FC.1, 14-aircraft production order – cancelled
|Fairey FC1, General Aircraft GAL.40
|-
|16/38
|
|Trainer – Master I production order
|Miles Master T.Mk.I
|-
|B.17/38
|
|Twin-engine medium bomber of mixed wood/metal construction
|Bristol Type 155 (cancelled by Bristol)
|-
|B.18/38
|
|Twin-engine medium bomber of mixed wood/metal construction
|Armstrong Whitworth Albemarle
|-
|B.19/38
|
|Bomber with 8,000 lb load and eight 20mm cannon in two turrets – revised to become B.1/39
|Bristol Type 157
|-
|20/38
|
|Communications aircraft – Vega Gull order
|Percival Vega Gull
|-
|21/38
|
|Communications aircraft – Dominie production order
|de Havilland Dominie
|-
|S.22/38
|
|Naval helicopter
|Cierva C.41 Gyrodyne
|-
|24/38
|
|Twin-engine communications aircraft – Envoy production order
|Airspeed Envoy
|-
|25/38
|
|Twin-engine communications aircraft
|Percival Petrel
|-
|26/38
|OR.65
|Three-seat wireless or navigation training aircraft with dual controls – Vega Gull adapted for communications training
|Percival Proctor I
|-
|28/38
|OR.66
|Two-seat helicopter – written for Weir W.6
|Weir W.6
|-
|T.29/38
|
|Twin-engine R/T (Radio Telephony) training aircraft – Dominie three aircraft order
|de Havilland Dominie
|-
|B.1/39
|
|"Ideal Bomber" four-engined heavy bomber with 9,000 lb bomb load and 20mm cannon defence (revised B.19/38) – work suspended June 1940
|Handley Page H.P.60, Bristol Type 159, a Gloster submission, Armstrong Whitworth AW.68
|-
|T.4/39
|OR.68
|Single-engined trainer
|Airspeed Cambridge – (two prototypes ordered, no production contract)
|-
|R.5/39
|
|Long-range patrol flying boat – Sunderland replacement – superseded by R.14/40 (q.v.)
|Saunders-Roe S.38 – later cancelled
|-
|N.8/39
|
|Naval two-seat carrier-borne fighter – Roc replacement – replaced by N.5/40
|see N.5/40
|-
|N.9/39
|
|Naval two-seat carrier-borne fighter – Fulmar replacement – replaced by N.5/40
|see N.5/40
|-
|F.17/39
|
|Long-range fighter development of Bristol Beaufort – written for Beaufighter
|Bristol Beaufighter
|-
|F.18/39
|
|Fighter – Hurricane/Spitfire replacement
|Martin-Baker M.B.3, Martin-Baker M.B.5
|-
|19/39
|
|Twin-engine transport aircraft – order for Hertfordshire later cancelled
|de Havilland Hertfordshire
|-
|20/39
|
|Twin-engine communications aircraft – order for No. XXIV Squadron RAF
|de Havilland Flamingo
|-
|21/39
|
|Twin-engine VIP transport aircraft – order for The King's Flight
|de Havilland Flamingo
|-
|F.22/39
|OR.76
|Fighter fitted with heavy-calibre nose-mounted gun
|Vickers 414 Vickers Type 432 – also tests with Vickers Type 439 testbed – specification later cancelled
|-
|B.23/39
|
|Very high altitude version of Wellington capable of operating at 40,000 ft
|Vickers Wellington V
|-
|E.28/39
|
|Experimental aircraft using Whittle jet-propulsion with provision for 4 × 0.303 machine guns
|Gloster E.28/39
|}

1940–1949

Post 1949 specifications. Air Staff Operational Requirements/targets

Naval requirement/Aircraft, Naval Staff requirements

General Staff Requirements For Aircraft

See also
 Operational Requirement (OR)
 British military aircraft designation systems
 General Staff Target – the British Army equivalent
 Specification (technical standard)
 List of Operational Requirements for nuclear weapons

References
Notes

Citations

Bibliography
 Aeroplane Monthly'' magazine. Various articles, various issues, 1973–1987.

Further reading
 
 
 
 : This is a combined volume made up of

External links
 
 
 

British military aircraft
United Kingdom
Air Ministry
Air Ministry specifications
United Kingdom defence procurement